The 1980 Australian Championship of Makes was a CAMS sanctioned Australian motor racing title open to Touring Cars complying with Group C regulations. It was the tenth manufacturers’ title to be awarded by CAMS and the fifth to carry the Australian Championship of Makes name. The title was awarded to Holden.

Calendar
The 1980 Australian Championship of Makes was contested over a three-round series with one race per round.

Classes
Cars competed in four engine displacement classes:
 Up to 1600cc
 1600 to 2000cc
 2001 to 3000cc
 3001 to 6000cc

Points system
Championship points were awarded on a 9-6-4-3-2-1 basis to the best six placed cars in each class. Only the highest scoring car of each make was awarded points and then only the points applicable to the position filled.
The title was awarded to the make of car gaining the highest number of points in the series with all points acquired in all races counted. No drivers' title was allocated or permitted to be advertised in connection with the title.

Results

References

Championship of Makes
Australian Manufacturers' Championship
Australian Championship of Makes